State Road 998 (SR 998)  is an east–west road in Homestead, Florida, connecting the southern terminus of SR 997 with U.S. Route 1 (US 1). It is the highest numbered three-digit state highway in Florida.

Route description

SR 998 starts at the intersection of Campbell Road and Krome Avenue (SR 997 north/CR 997 south) and heads east, crossing the South Miami-Dade Busway, and ending at South Dixie Highway (US 1).

History
SR 998 was created in 2019 as part of a road swap between the Florida Department of Transportation (FDOT) and the county of Miami-Dade as part of FDOT's Krome Avenue widening project. Since the portion of former SR 997 on Krome Avenue passes through a portion of downtown Homestead that could not accommodate a road widening, the state relinquished the highway to the county in exchange for Campbell Road entering the state highway system.

Major intersections

References

External links

998
998
Homestead, Florida
State highways in the United States shorter than one mile